The Western Washington Vikings program represented Western Washington University in college football at the NCAA Division II level. The Vikings were members of the Great Northwest Athletic Conference.

NCAA playoff appearances

NCAA Division II
The Vikings appeared in the Division II playoffs one time, with an overall record of 0–1.

Rivalries

Central Washington

References

 
1903 establishments in Washington (state)
2008 disestablishments in Washington (state)
American football teams established in 1903
American football teams disestablished in 2008